Johnson Newlon Camden Jr. (January 5, 1865 – August 16, 1942) was a United States senator from Kentucky. His father, Johnson N. Camden, had been a United States Senator from West Virginia.

Born in Parkersburg, West Virginia, Camden Jr. attended Episcopal High School in Alexandria, Virginia, Phillips Academy in Andover, Massachusetts, Virginia Military Institute in Lexington, Virginia, Columbia Law School in New York City, and the law school at University of Virginia in Charlottesville. Although admitted to the bar in 1888, he never practiced.

Camden moved to Spring Hill Farm, near Versailles, Kentucky, in 1890 and became involved in farming and Thoroughbred horse breeding and racing. He served for a time as president of the Kentucky Jockey Club. He was also interested in the opening and development of the coal fields in eastern Kentucky. He was appointed as a Democrat to the U.S. Senate on June 16, 1914, to fill a vacancy caused by the death of his predecessor, William O. Bradley.

He was elected on November 3, 1914, and served until March 3, 1915. He was not a candidate for renomination in 1914.

He went back to agricultural activities on a farm near Paris, Kentucky, until he died, aged 77. He was buried in Frankfort Cemetery in Frankfort.

In what is a mystery to many, Camden had the University Library at the then Morehead State Teachers College, now Morehead State University in Morehead, Kentucky, named for him in 1929. Camden had no ties to the school, nor had ever visited.

Sources
 

1865 births
1942 deaths
Burials at Frankfort Cemetery
People from Paris, Kentucky
People from Versailles, Kentucky
Columbia Law School alumni
People from Virginia
Politicians from Parkersburg, West Virginia
Democratic Party United States senators from Kentucky
American racehorse owners and breeders
Kentucky Democrats